The Realest may refer to:

"The Realest", a song by Lizzo from the 2015 album Big Grrrl Small World
"The Realest", a song by Issues from the 2016 album Headspace

See also
Tha Realest (born 1973), American rapper
Da REAList, 2008 album by Plies